Rochambeau or Ro-Sham-Bo may refer to:

Arts and media
 "Roshambo", a song by The Network
 Another name for the game of rock–paper–scissors
 A game similar to "sack tapping" played by characters on the animated TV show South Park
 A 1992 album by the band Farside
 Ro Sham Bo (album), 1994 album by The Grays

People 
 Jean-Baptiste Donatien de Vimeur, comte de Rochambeau (1725–1807), French nobleman and soldier who participated in the American Revolutionary War
 Donatien-Marie-Joseph de Vimeur, vicomte de Rochambeau (1755–1813), French soldier, the son of Jean-Baptiste Donatien de Vimeur, comte de Rochambeau

Places 
 Cayenne – Rochambeau Airport in South America
 Rochambeau, a building in Washington D.C. designed by Thomas Franklin Schneider
 Rochambeau Middle School in Connecticut
 Rochambeau Monument, a statue in Newport, Rhode Island
 Rochambeau French International School, a private French international school in Maryland
 Rochambeau Library-Providence Community Library, a historic public library in Providence, Rhode Island
 Rochambeau Worsted Company Mill, a historic textile mill in Providence, Rhode Island

Vessels
 French ironclad Rochambeau
 SS Rochambeau, a French Transatlantic ocean liner
 USS Rochambeau (AP-63), American ship